Year 1010 (MX) was a common year starting on Sunday (link will display the full calendar) of the Julian calendar.

Events 
 By place 

 Africa 
 The Nile river in Egypt freezes over.

 Asia 
 The Lý dynasty is established in Vietnam (or 1009), and moves the capital to Thăng Long (modern-day Hanoi).
 Second conflict in the Goryeo–Khitan War: The Goryeo king is unseated in a revolt, resulting in an invasion by the Liao dynasty, and the burning of the Korean capital Gaegyeong.
 Song Zhun of Song dynasty China completes the work of the earlier geographer Lu Duosun, an enormous atlas of China that is written and illustrated in 1,556 chapters, showing maps of each region, city, town, and village (the atlas took 39 years to complete).
 In the Chola dynasty of southern India, the first votes are celebrated by adding a ballot in an urn.

 Japan 
 January – Fujiwara no Kenshi (daughter of Michinaga) is married to the imperial heir Crown Prince Okisada.
 February 14 – On the death of Fujiwara no Korechika his daughter, the poet Fujiwara no Chikako, becomes a lady-in-waiting to Empress Shōshi.
 Emperor Ichijō wants to retire – the influential statesman Fujiwara no Michinaga supports Crown Prince Okisada (now his son-in-law), who will be the successor, but the emperor prefers his eldest son by the late Empress Teishi, Prince Atsuyasu, who has been raised by Empress Shōshi, who also supports her stepson, leading to conflict at court.

 Americas 
 Viking explorer Thorfinn Karlsefni attempts to found a settlement in North America (approximate date).

 Europe 
 June 2 - Fitna of al-Andalus – Battle of Aqbat al-Bakr: The Caliphate of Córdoba is defeated.   Allied to Muslim rebels, Ramon Borrell, Count of Barcelona sacks Córdoba, and Hisham II the Nephast is restored as Umayyad caliph of Córdoba, succeeding Muhammad II al-Mahdi.
 The Russian city of Yaroslavl is founded, as an outpost of the principality of Rostov Veliky.

 By topic 

 Art 
 The construction of Brihadisvara Temple in Thanjavur (a city now in Tamil Nadu, India) is completed during the Chola dynasty, and at about this time the wall painting Rajaraja I and His Teacher is made within it.

 Literature 
 March 8 – Persian poet Ferdowsi finishes writing the Shahnameh (Book of Kings), which will be regarded as the national epic of the greater Iranian culture.
 Lady Murasaki writes The Tale of Genji in Japanese (approximate date).
 Beowulf is written anonymously in Old English (approximate date).

 Technology 
 Eilmer of Malmesbury in England attempts flight in a glider of his own construction.
 The 217 ft tall Brihadisvara Temple, considered as an architectural 1000-year-old marvel was completed

Births 
 May 30 – Zhao Zhen, Emperor Renzong of the Song dynasty (d. 1063)
 Adalbero, bishop of Würzburg (approximate date)
 Adalbero III of Luxembourg, German nobleman (d. 1072)
 Akkadevi, princess of the Chalukya dynasty (d. 1064)
 Anno II, archbishop of Cologne (approximate date)
 Arialdo, Italian nobleman and deacon (approximate date)
 Benno, bishop of Meissen (approximate date) 
 Eberhard, archbishop of Trier (approximate date)
 Eleanor of Normandy, countess of Flanders (d. 1077)
 Gebhard, archbishop of Salzburg (approximate date)
 Gomes Echigues, Portuguese knight and governor (d. 1065)
 Honorius II, antipope of the Catholic Church (approximate date)
 John V of Gaeta, Italian nobleman (approximate date)
 Michael IV the Paphlagonian, Byzantine emperor (d. 1041)
 Odo (or Eudes), Gascon nobleman (approximate date)
 Otloh of Sankt Emmeram, German monk (approximate date)
 Siegfried I, German nobleman (approximate date)
 Tunka Manin, ruler of the Ghana Empire (d. 1078)

Deaths 
 February 14 – Fujiwara no Korechika, Japanese nobleman (b. 974)
 Ælfric of Eynsham, English abbot and scholar (approximate date)
 Abu'l-Nasr Muhammad, Farighunid ruler (approximate date)
 Aimoin, French monk and chronicler (approximate date)
 Aisha, Andalusian poet and writer (approximate date)
 Cathal mac Conchobar mac Taidg, king of Connacht
 Ermengol I (or Armengol), count of Urgell (b. 974)
 John Kourkouas, Byzantine catepan (approximate date)
 Maelsuthan Ua Cerbhail, Irish advisor and chronicler
 Vijayanandi, Indian mathematician (approximate date)

References

Sources